The Dariush Grand Hotel is a 185-room, €185 million, five-star hotel located on the eastern part of Kish Island in the Persian Gulf. It is named after Darius I, son in law of Cyrus the Great of Iran (Persia).

Establishment
Dariush Grand Hotel's architecture is inspired by Persepolis, a symbol of the ancient Persian architecture and the Achaemenid Empire of Iran. The hotel was designed and developed by Iranian entrepreneur Hossein Sabet, who also owns and manages several tourist attractions and hotels in the Canary Islands. The hotel was completed in 2003 and is owned by a number of companies.

Management
On 7 May 2004, it was announced that the Rezidor Hotel Group would manage the Dariush Grand Hotel for ten years, with the intention of rebranding the hotel as a Radisson SAS property in the future. In 2006, Rezidor and the owner of the hotel agreed to cancel the contract. The general manager at the time was Sascha Kaiser, a German national. It is now owned by Seyed Abdolreza Mousavi, and is run by Hamidreza Makhmalbaf.

Gallery

References

External links

 Dariush Grand Hotel
 Dariush Hotel pictures
 Dariush Hotel reservations
 https://www.instagram.com/hoteldariushkish/

Architecture in Iran
Hotels in Iran
Kish Island
Buildings and structures in Hormozgan Province